The 1996–97 season was Mansfield Town's 60th season in the Football League and 24th in the Third Division they finished in 11th position with 64 points.

Final league table

Results

Football League Third Division

FA Cup

League Cup

League Trophy

Squad statistics
 Squad list sourced from

References
General
 Mansfield Town 1996–97 at soccerbase.com (use drop down list to select relevant season)

Specific

Mansfield Town F.C. seasons
Mansfield Town